Erdal Beşikçioğlu (born 5 January 1970) is a Turkish actor.

Biography 
Erdal Beşikçioğlu is of paternal Laz and maternal Albanian descent. He is a maternal nephew of İlhan Cavcav.

Beşikçioğlu attended İzmir Private Turkish College and Mehmet Seyfi Eraltay High School after which he studied at the Hacettepe University State Conservatory. He participated in creative workshops with William Gaskill among others. Upon graduating, he started working in several state theatres and was head of the Diyarbakır State Theatre between 1995 and 1996. He has acted in a number of films such as Eve Giden Yol 1914, Barda, Vali, Hayat Var, Kurtlar Vadisi Filistin and the Golden Bear winning Bal. He now stars as the title character Police commissioner  Behzat Ç in the series Behzat Ç. Erdal Beşikçioğlu won the Golden Orange for Best Actor for his role in Behzat Ç.: Seni Kalbime Gömdüm, a spinoff film of the series. He is brilliant in the TV series 46 as Dr, Murat Gurnay, in a black comedy take on the Jekyll and Hyde story alternately dark and menacing and then playful and sensitive.

He is married to the actress Elvin Beşikçioğlu. He is also the owner of Tatbikat Sahnesi theaters located in Ankara and Istanbul.

Filmography

Film 
 Bergen (2022)
 Acı Kiraz (2020)
 Kapı (2019)
 Çiçero (2019)
 Fakat Müzeyyen Bu Derin Bir Tutku (2014)
 Behzat Ç. Ankara Yanıyor (2013)
 Behzat Ç. Seni Kalbime Gömdüm (2011)
 Kurtlar Vadisi Filistin (2010)
 Bal (2010)
 Kardelen (2010)
 Vali (2009)
 Vali (2008)
 Hayat Var (2008)
 Eve Giden Yol (2006)
 Barda (2006)

Television 
 Hakim (2022)
 Hamlet (2021)
 Kağıt Ev (2021)
 Çocukluk (2020)
 Adı Efsane (2017)
 46 Yok Olan (2016)
 Reaksiyon (2014)
 Leyla ile Mecnun (2011)
 Behzat Ç. Bir Ankara Polisiyesi (2010–2013; 2019)
 Es-Es (2008)
 Ayrılık (2009)
 Köprü (2006–2008)
 Seni Çok Özledim (2005)
 Ödünç Hayat (2005)
 Körfez Ateşi (2005)
 Kasırga İnsanları (2004)
 Mars Kapıdan Baktırır (2004)
 Tatlı Hayat (2003)

References

External links

 

1970 births
Living people
Male actors from Ankara
Turkish people of Laz descent
Turkish people of Albanian descent
Turkish male film actors
Turkish male stage actors
Turkish male television actors
21st-century Turkish male actors